"Incomplete" is a song by American R&B singer Sisqó. It was released on June 13, 2000, as the third and final single from his first solo album, Unleash the Dragon (1999). Written by Def Soul artist Montell Jordan and Anthony "Shep" Crawford, and produced by Crawford, the song was Sisqó's biggest solo single and his only number-one hit in the US, topping both the Billboard Hot 100 chart and the Billboard Hot R&B/Hip-Hop Singles & Tracks chart. "Incomplete" is also Sisqó's third and most recent Hot 100 top-40 hit; within two years of its release, Sisqó would return to his role as Dru Hill's lead singer.

Background
Jordan says the song is "about a guy who literally had everything but without the girl his life would be incomplete". It was originally recorded by LaFace Records artist Sam Salter. Jordan and Crawford offered "Incomplete" to Sisqó in 1999, as he was recording his debut solo album. Sisqó wasn't particularly fond of the song, a slow ballad close in style to those he recorded as lead singer of Dru Hill, and had to be coerced into recording the composition.

Music video
"Incomplete" features Sisqó in the role of a rich and famous man who appears to have everything he wants in life, except for the love of the woman (played by LisaRaye McCoy) who left him some time ago. The song's music video, directed by Chris Robinson, depicts Sisqó as living a solitary life in a large mansion, and spending his free time remembering his happier times.

Personnel
 Lead vocals performed, produced, and arranged by Sisqó
 Background vocals performed by Shae Jones
 Written by Montell Jordan and Anthony "Shep" Crawford
 Produced by Anthony "Shep" Crawford

Charts and certifications

Weekly charts

Year-end charts

Certifications

|}

Release history

See also
 List of Billboard Hot 100 number-one singles of 2000

References

1999 songs
2000 singles
Billboard Hot 100 number-one singles
Contemporary R&B ballads
Music videos directed by Chris Robinson (director)
Sisqó songs
Songs written by Montell Jordan
Songs written by Shep Crawford